Daniel Brejčák (born 29 October 1986) is a Slovak professional ice hockey player who currently playing for HK Poprad of the Slovak Extraliga.

Career
He previously played for with  MHK Kežmarok, HC Košice, SV Kaltern and MsHK Žilina.

Career statistics

Regular season and playoffs

References

External links

1986 births
Living people
Sportspeople from Poprad
Slovak ice hockey defencemen
HK Poprad players
MHK Kežmarok players
MsHK Žilina players
SV Kaltern players
HC Košice players
Competitors at the 2013 Winter Universiade
Expatriate ice hockey players in Italy
Slovak expatriate sportspeople in Italy
Slovak expatriate ice hockey people